The FC Basel 1931–32 season was their thirty ninth season since the club's foundation on 15 November 1893. FC Basel played their home games in the Landhof in the district Wettstein in Kleinbasel. The club's new chairman Franz Rinderer, who took over the presidency from Otto Kuhn at the AGM on 11 July 1931.

Overview 
Last season's coach/manager Austrian Gustav Putzendopler stayed on for his second season as trainer. Fellow Austrian international Otto Haftl signed in from AC Sparta Prague to the team becoming Basel's first ever fully professional football player. During his first season at the club he also acted as player-manager after Putzendopler laid down the job as trainer. The team played a total of 35 matches in their 1931–32 season. 16 of these matches were in the domestic league, six matches in the Swiss Cup and 13 games were friendly matches. Of these 13 friendlies four were played in the Landhof, six other games were also played in Switzerland. Only one was played in Germany against FV Lörrach and another one was played in France against CA Mulhouse. Of the friendly games, ten games ended with a victory, two were drawn and one match ended with a defeat.

The previous season the top tier of Swiss football had three regional groups each with 11 teams. The number of teams was reduced from 33 to 18, which meant that 15 teams were relegated. The newly formed and renamed domestic league, now Nationalliga, started at the end of August. The new 1931–32 Nationalliga was now divided into two groups, each with nine teams, coming from the whole of Switzerland and no longer just regional groups. The top team in each group would advance to the finals. The two second placed teams would have a play-off to decide the third final place and the curiosity this season the second tier champions would also qualify to the finals. Basel were allocated to Group 1. The league season started very badly, they lost their first five games straight off, conceding 27 goals. Not only did Basel change their trainer, but they also changed their goalkeeper and various players. In the second half of the season things improved and with six victories in the last seven games Basel were able to rise from the foot of the table. They finished the season four points above the relegation zone. FC Bern and St. Gallen were relegated from this group, Étoile-Sporting and Old Boys from the other group.

Zürich were group 1 winners and as second placed Urania Genève Sport won the play-off against Biel-Bienne, these two teams advanced to the finals with group 2 winners Grasshopper Club. As mentioned the second tier champions were also qualified for the finals, this being Lausanne-Sport. After the four teams had each played their three games, Zürich and Lausanne were then level, each with four points and a play-off decided the championship. The curiosity that a second-tier team would become Swiss champions happened, because Lausanne won the play-off 5–2.

In the 1st principal round of the Swiss Cup Basel were drawn away against and defeated lower classed SC Veltheim. They needed a reply in the second round to beat Lugano and were victorious against lower classed SC Brühl St. Gallen in the third round. Then a quarter-final victory over La Chaux-de-Fonds took the team into a semi-final against Grasshopper Club. However this ended with a rather hefty defeat 1–8 and that fits completely into the picture of a rather disappointing season. The Grasshoppers won the final 5–1 against Urania Genève Sport

An episode that is noted in association with the Cup, was the second-round replay away against FC Lugano on 22 November 1931. The mood amongst the 3,000 spectators was heated even before the kick-off. This because after the 3–3 draw in the first game; the local press had circulated the most incredible rumours.  Then, Basel's Alfred Schlecht scored the winning goal early, not even two minutes after the game had started. However, shortly before the end of the match referee Hans Wüthrich did not blow his whistle and award a penalty after an alleged handball by a Basel player. The referee ended the game shortly afterwards with a Basel victory and the ill tempers were worsened. After the game there were tumults and riots among the spectators who were not satisfied with the referee's performance. Stones were thrown at referee and players and the windows of the changing rooms were smashed. It was some eight hours later, before things were settled enough, for the police to able to bring both the referee and the entire Basel team to safety, by ship over Lake Lugano. According to the reports in the club chronicles, quite a few players were injured. Josef Remay had a bleeding head, Hermann Enderlin had a hole above his eye, Leopold Kielholz and goalkeeper Paul Blumer were also hurt.

Players 
Squad members

 

Players who left the squad

Results

Legend

Friendly matches

Pre- and mid-season

Winter break

Nationalliga

Group 1 results

Group 1 table

Swiss Cup

See also 
 History of FC Basel
 List of FC Basel players
 List of FC Basel seasons

References

Sources 
 Rotblau: Jahrbuch Saison 2014/2015. Publisher: FC Basel Marketing AG. 
 Die ersten 125 Jahre. Publisher: Josef Zindel im Friedrich Reinhardt Verlag, Basel. 
 FCB team 1931–32 at fcb-archiv.ch
 Switzerland 1931–32 at RSSSF

External links
 FC Basel official site

FC Basel seasons
Basel